The Odeon (1835 – c. 1846) of Boston, Massachusetts, was a lecture and concert hall on Federal Street in the building also known as the Boston Theatre. The 1,300-seat auditorium measured "50 feet square" with "red moreen"-upholstered "seats arranged in a circular order, and above them ... spacious galleries." The Boston Academy of Music occupied the Odeon in the 1830s and 1840s Notable events at the Odeon included "the first performance in Boston of a Beethoven symphony."

Events

1830s
 Samuel A. Elliot opening address
 Joseph Story "on the life and professional character of the late Chief Justice Marshall"
 William Apess lecture
 James Madison memorial
 William Ellery Channing lecture
 Charles Zeuner concert
 Edward Everett lecture
 A.E. Grimké lecture
 Samuel J. May lecture
 Ralph Waldo Emerson lecture
 Society for the Prevention of Pauperism meeting

1840s
 Musical Convention
 Boston Children's Friend Society fundraiser
 Massachusetts Temperance Union meeting
 Boston Brigade Band concert
 George Lunt presentation
 Edgar Allan Poe reading

References

Further reading

 
 Michael Broyles. "Music and Class Structure in Antebellum Boston." Journal of the American Musicological Society, Vol. 44, No. 3 (Autumn, 1991), pp. 451–493

1835 establishments in Massachusetts
1840s disestablishments in Massachusetts
Cultural history of Boston
19th century in Boston
Former theatres in Boston
Financial District, Boston
Event venues established in 1835